Franklin MacVeagh (November 22, 1837July 6, 1934) was an American politician, lawyer, grocer and banker.  He served as the United States Secretary of the Treasury under President William Howard Taft.

Biography 
MacVeagh was born on November 22, 1837, in Phoenixville, Pennsylvania, to Major John MacVeagh and the former Margaret Lincoln. His brother, Isaac Wayne MacVeagh, became the U.S. Attorney General under Presidents James A. Garfield and Chester A. Arthur.

MacVeagh graduated from Yale University in 1862, where he was a member of Skull and Bones. He graduated from Columbia Law School in 1864.  He worked as a wholesale grocer and lawyer.  MacVeagh was a Methodist. He married Emily Eames in 1868; they had five children.

He had been director of the Commercial National Bank of Chicago for 29 years when President and fellow Bonesman William Howard Taft tapped him to be Secretary of the Treasury in 1909. He did not tackle the pressing problem of currency reform, leaving it to the National Monetary Commission, which had been established by the Aldrich-Vreeland Act of 1908; he did, however, stress the urgency of reform in his annual report. He is remembered for increasing the efficiency and general progressiveness of the Treasury Department: He abolished 450 unnecessary positions, rehabilitated the U.S. Customs Service with the introduction of electric automatic weighing devices and accepted certified checks instead of currency for customs and internal revenue payments. He was also involved in the creation of the buffalo nickel.

MacVeagh was the eighth president in 1885 of the Commercial Club of Chicago.

His Washington D.C., home at 2829 16th St., NW, was designed and built between 1910-1911 by noted architect Nathan C. Wyeth.  It is now home to the Mexican Cultural Institute of the Embassy of Mexico.  He also owned a large summer estate in Dublin, New Hampshire (now listed on the National Register of Historic Places) known as Knollwood.

Franklin MacVeagh died in Chicago, Illinois, on July 6, 1934, at age 96, and was interred in Graceland Cemetery in Chicago.

References

External links 

 Franklin MacVeagh biography for Department of the Treasury
 Rice on History profiles for Nomination by Secretary of the Treasury Franklin MacVeagh

1837 births
1934 deaths
20th-century American politicians
People from Phoenixville, Pennsylvania
Burials at Graceland Cemetery (Chicago)
Columbia Law School alumni
Yale University alumni
Illinois Republicans
United States Secretaries of the Treasury
Taft administration cabinet members
Washington, D.C., Republicans